Stenophysa is a genus of gastropods belonging to the family Physidae.

The species of this genus are found in America and Africa.

Species:

Stenophysa marmorata , synonym Aplexa marmorata
Stenophysa maugeriae 
Stenophysa meigsii 
Stenophysa simoni  (taxon inquirendum)
Stenophysa spathidophallus 
Synonyms
 Stenophysa venezuelensis (Martens, 1859): synonym of Aplexa venezuelensis (E. von Martens, 1859)

References

 Bank, R. A. (2017). Classification of the Recent freshwater/brackish Gastropoda of the World. Last update: January 24, 2018. OpenAccess publication.

Gastropods